The Wiesbadener Tagblatt (also known as the WT) was a regional daily newspaper for the area in and around the state capital of Hesse, Wiesbaden in Germany.

The newspaper was established in the 1840s by August Schellenberg under the name Wiesbadener Wochenblatt. It was renamed Wiesbadener Tagblatt in 1852. It was part of Rhein-Main-Presse and was published by Verlagsgruppe Rhein Main, together with the Wiesbadener Kurier. In 2013, the editorial office was merged with Wiesbadener Kurier and relocated to Mainz. The newspaper ceased publication in January 2020.

References

External links 
 Official website 

1852 establishments in Germany
Publications disestablished in 1943
Defunct newspapers published in Germany
German-language newspapers
Mass media in Wiesbaden
Daily newspapers published in Germany
Publications established in 1852